Through the Dark is a 4 minute 3D-animated interactive film, which is viewed in a web browser and rendered in real-time. The film is a collaboration between Google Play Music and Australian hip hop group Hilltop Hoods, featuring the band's song of the same title ("Through the Dark"). The song was written by band member MC Pressure (Daniel Smith) after his son was diagnosed with leukemia at eight-years-old. Based on this experience, which is told through the song's lyrics, the film tells an emotional story of a boy and his father. Through the Dark has been awarded over 50 accolades at international award shows.

Technical Aspects

Through the Dark is experienced within a web browser and uses standard web technologies such as WebGL and Web Audio API. When viewed on a mobile device, the film's virtual camera is mapped to the device's accelerometer. The camera angle within the film is changed when the device is rotated or tilted, allowing the viewer to move between two worlds of light and dark. When viewed on a computer, the movement of the camera is controlled by scrolling.

Accolades

References

External links 

 Through the Dark behind-the-scenes video

Interactive films